The Bangladesh National Award for Best Film (officially National Award Best Film ) is one of the categories in the National Film Awards presented annually by the Department of Films and Publications, the organisation set up by Ministry of Information in Bangladesh. It is the highest award for films in Bangladesh. This award goes to the producers of the film and is the only category in a year.

Lathial, produced and directed by Narayan Ghosh Mita, won the first National Film Awards for Best Film in 1975. Chashi Nazrul Islam and Tauquir Ahmed are the most honoured directors,  they both have three films—Shuvoda (1986), Padma Meghna Jamuna (1991), Hason Raja (2002); and Joyjatra (2004), Daruchini Dip (2007), Oggatonama (2016) respectively —won the award. Followed by Sheikh Niamat Ali, Amjad Hossain and Morshedul Islam, Tanvir Mokammel (two each).

List of winners
Key

Individuals with multiple wins

9 wins 
 Faridur Reza Sagar

2 wins
 Sheikh Niamat Ali
 Tanvir Mokammel
 Morshedul Islam

Production companies with multiple wins

See also
 Bangladesh National Film Award for Best Short Film
 Bangladesh National Film Award for Best Director

Notes

References

Sources

 
 
 
 
 
 
 

Film
National Film Awards (Bangladesh)
Best Film National Film Award (Bangladesh) winners